Gun ownership is the status of owning a gun, either legal or illegal. In 2018, Small Arms Survey reported that there are over one billion small arms distributed globally, of which 857 million (about 85 percent) are in civilian hands. The Small Arms Survey stated that U.S. civilians alone account for 393 million (about 46 percent) of the worldwide total of civilian held firearms. This amounts to "120.5 firearms for every 100 residents."

The world's armed forces control about 133 million (approximately 18 percent) of the global total of small arms, of which over 43 percent belong to two countries: the Russian Federation (30.3 million) and China (27.5 million). Law enforcement agencies control about 23 million (about 2 percent) of the global total of small arms.

Global distribution of civilian-held firearms 

The following data comes from the Small Arms Survey. For more tables see: Estimated number of civilian guns per capita by country and Percent of households with guns by country.

Association with rates of violence in times of peace

Some studies suggest that higher rates of gun ownership are associated with higher homicide rates, although Gary Kleck argues that the highest-quality studies show that gun ownership does not increase homicide rates. Higher rates of gun ownership are also associated with higher suicide rates and higher accidental gun death rates. The availability of illegal guns, but not that of legal guns, is associated with higher rates of violent crime. Studies have shown that 36.3% of people had access to a gun and 5% carried the gun with them. However 7.3% stored their guns in an unsafe place. Certain people have blamed individuals with mental disorders for being dangerous and  violent with the use of guns. Nonetheless, other studies have been conducted and show that 34.1% have access to guns. 4.8% carry a gun with them and 6.2% store the gun in an unsafe manner. The statistics show that gun ownership is significantly high in both sets of individuals, however, none of the figures show people with a mental illness are as dangerous with guns than people with perfect mental health.

An international study by UNICRI researchers from 2001 examined the link between household gun ownership and overall homicide, overall suicide, as well as gun homicide and gun suicide rates amongst 21 countries. Significant correlations between household gun ownership and rates of gun suicides for both genders, and gun homicide rates involving female victims were found. There were no significant correlations detected for total homicide and suicide rates, as well as gun homicide rates involving male victims. This study has been criticized for combining high-income countries (like the United States) with middle-income countries (like Estonia); if middle-income countries are excluded from the analysis, a strong  relationship emerges between gun ownership and homicide. However the Hemenway study has been criticized in response as well. When removing the United States as an outlier and using the superior proxy of gun ownership in the study (percentage of firearm suicides over all suicides), the relationship ceases to be significant. The association between gun ownership and homicide rates across nations is dependent on the inclusion of the U.S. Studies in Canada that examined the levels of gun ownership by province have found no correlations with provincial overall suicide rates. A 2011 study conducted looking at the effects of gun control legislation passed in Canada and the associated effects in homicide rates found no significant reductions in homicide rates as a result of legislation. A case-control study conducted in New Zealand looking at household gun ownership and the risk of suicides found no significant associations.

See also
 Gun control
 Gun culture in the United States

References

Further reading

The Washington Post article (June 2018) 
Time article (June 2018) 
The Washington Free Beacon article (June 2018) 
The New York Times (June 2018) 
The Guardian article (June 2018) 
Newsweek article (June 2018) 
The Star Tribune article (June 2018)  
The Associated Press article (June 2018) 
Reuters article (June 2018) 
New York Daily News article (June 2018) 

Firearms
Gun politics